Tougher Than Nails is the tenth studio album by American country music artist Joe Diffie. His only album for Broken Bow Records it was released on June 1, 2004. It The title track was a Top 20 hit on the Billboard Hot Country Singles & Tracks (now Hot Country Songs) charts in 2004, but the second single ("If I Could Only Bring You Back") failed to make Top 40.

Track listing

Personnel
Tim Akers - piano
J. T. Corenflos - electric guitar
Joe Diffie - acoustic guitar, lead vocals, background vocals
Larry Franklin - fiddle
Paul Franklin - Dobro, pedal steel guitar
Aubrey Haynie - fiddle, mandolin
George Jones - vocals on "What Would Waylon Do"
B. James Lowry - acoustic guitar
Gary Lunn - bass guitar
Brent Mason - electric guitar
Randy McCormick - piano
Steve Nathan - Hammond B-3 organ, piano
Larry Paxton - bass guitar
Gary Prim - piano
Jason Roller - electric guitar, soloist
Scotty Sanders - pedal steel guitar
Biff Watson - acoustic guitar
John Willis - acoustic guitar
Lonnie Wilson - drums, percussion
Glenn Worf - bass guitar
Jonathan Yudkin - strings

Chart performance

References

2004 albums
Albums produced by Buddy Cannon
BBR Music Group albums
Joe Diffie albums